Sarah Grace Perry  (born 28 November 1979) is an English author. She has had three novels published, all by Serpent's Tail: After Me Comes the Flood (2014), The Essex Serpent (2016) and Melmoth (2018). Her work has been translated into 22 languages.

Early life and education
Perry was born, the youngest of five sisters, in Chelmsford, Essex, into a family of devout Christians who were members of a Strict Baptist church. Growing up with almost no access to contemporary art, culture, and writing, she filled her time with classical music, classic novels and poetry, and church-related activities. She says this early immersion in old literature and the King James Bible profoundly influenced her writing style. She attended Chelmsford County High School for Girls. She married her husband Robert Perry at the age of 20. She graduated from Anglia Polytechnic University (now Anglia Ruskin University) with a degree in English Literature then worked briefly in the Civil Service.

Perry has a PhD in creative writing from Royal Holloway University where her supervisor was Sir Andrew Motion. Her doctoral thesis was on the Gothic in the writing of Iris Murdoch, and Perry has subsequently published an article on the Gothic in Aeon magazine.

In 2013 she was a writer in residence at Gladstone's Library.

Perry won the 2004 Shiva Naipaul Memorial prize for travel writing for 'A little unexpected', an article about her experiences in the Philippines.

In June 2018 Perry was elected Fellow of the Royal Society of Literature in its "40 Under 40" initiative.

Novels

After Me Comes the Flood
Perry's debut novel, After Me Comes the Flood, was released in 2014 by Serpent's Tail, receiving high praise from reviewers including those of The Daily Telegraph and The Guardian. The novel tells the story of a man named John Cole who wanders into a strange world while seeking out his brother amidst a drought. John Burnside, writing for The Guardian, called it "extraordinary" and "a remarkable debut."

The Essex Serpent

Her second novel, The Essex Serpent, was also published by Serpent's Tail in 2016.  Inspired by the myth of a sea serpent on the Essex coast, it tells the story of a Victorian widow, Cora Seaborne, and the friends who surround her after the death of her bullying husband. Cora is intrigued and compelled by the possibility of the serpent's return, but clashes with the local vicar, William Ransome, who is determined to lay superstition to rest in his rural parish.

The novel is again written in a gothic style, and explores themes of goodness, friendship, superstition, and love and once again received positive reviews; John Burnside, quoted on the book's cover, writes: "Had Charles Dickens and Bram Stoker come together to write the great Victorian novel, I wonder if it would have surpassed The Essex Serpent? No way of knowing, but with only her second outing, Sarah Perry establishes herself as one of the finest fiction writers working in Britain today."

It was placed on the long list for the 2017 Baileys Women's Prize for Fiction.

Melmoth
Her third novel is titled Melmoth, and was inspired by Charles Maturin's gothic novel Melmoth the Wanderer. It was published by Serpent's Tail in October 2018. Melmoth was shortlisted for the 2019 Dylan Thomas Prize.

References

External links
 Official website
 Sarah Perry at Rogers, Coleridge, and White literary agency

1979 births
Living people
English writers
English women novelists
People from Chelmsford
People educated at Chelmsford County High School for Girls
English women journalists
Alumni of Royal Holloway, University of London
Fellows of the Royal Society of Literature
English women non-fiction writers